John Lieswyn (born 18 August 1968 in Pittsburgh, Pennsylvania) is a former American professional road bicycle racer.

Biography
John started his road racing career in Florida in 1985, and raced for the University of Florida's Cycling Club (Team Florida). After graduation from college in 1990, he raced three seasons for the US National team in Germany, France and Italy. John turned professional in 1993 for Coors Light. He returned to Europe in 1995, scoring numerous top ten results and winning the Delémont (Switzerland) mountain stage of the Regio-Tour. After taking a break in 1996, he focused on the US domestic scene with over 40 major wins. In the pre and post US-season, he competed in South America, Australia and New Zealand, notably taking three stage wins in the Herald Sun Tour (Australia), and overall victory at the Southland Tour (NZ), the Nature Valley Grand Prix in Minnesota, and Tour de Beauce (Canada). He finished second in his last USA professional race, the 2005 San Francisco Grand Prix.  His fifth and last time representing the USA National Team was the 2005 World Road Cycling Championships in Spain, where he was a domestique (worker) for the USA team sprinters.  He retired from racing at the end of the 2005 season and moved to New Zealand to work as a transportation planner. In 2012 he returned to the USA and lived in Davis, California; before returning to New Zealand in 2015.

Selected palmarès

1989
1st Tour of the Gila (NM, USA)
1991
1st USA National Team Time Trial (100 km)
3rd National Championships, Road, Amateurs (USA)
1995
1st Delemont Stage, Regio-Tour (Switzerland/France)
1999
1st Chris Thater Memorial Criterium (N.Y.)
Stage win, Herald Sun Tour (Australia)
2000
3rd Overall U.S. Pro Cycling Tour
2nd US National Time Trial Championship
2001
1st Stage 3, Tour of Willamette (OR, USA)
1st KoM, Tour de 'Toona (PA, USA)
1st Road Race, Fitchburg Stage Race (MA, USA)
1st Chris Thater Memorial Criterium (NY, USA)
2002
1st Overall, Tour of Southland (New Zealand)
1st Overall and Stage 2, Nature Valley Grand Prix (MN, USA)
1st Overall, Copa América de Ciclismo (Brazil)
2003
1st Overall and Stage 1, Tour de Beauce, Quebec (Canada)
1st Stage 4, Redlands Bicycle Classic (CA, USA)
1st Shelby Criterium (NC, USA)
Stage win, Superweek
9th Overall, Tour de Georgia (GA, USA)
2004
1st Overall, International Tour de Toona (PA, USA)
1st Overall, Tour of Southland (New Zealand)
1st Overall, Tour of Tobago (Trinidad and Tobago)
1st Points Competition, Wachovia Series Lancaster
1st Points Competition, Wachovia Series Trenton
1st Stage 3, International Tour de Toona (PA, USA)
1st Stage 5, Nature Valley Grand Prix (MN, USA)
1st Stage 2, Tour of Kansas City (MO, USA)
1st Overall, Gateway Cup (MO, USA)
1st Greentree Festival Criterium (MO, USA)
1st Giro della Montagne (MO, USA)
2005
1st Overall and Stage 2, Nature Valley Grand Prix (MN, USA)
2nd San Francisco Grand Prix (CA, USA)

References

External links

Diary Entries on cycling News

1968 births
Living people
American male cyclists
American emigrants to New Zealand
Sportspeople from Pittsburgh